The House ( and Husid) is a 1983 Icelandic mystery horror film directed by Egill Eðvarðsson. The film was selected as the Icelandic entry for the Best Foreign Language Film at the 56th Academy Awards, but was not accepted as a nominee.

Cast
 Róbert Arnfinnsson
 Þóra Borg
 Borgar Garðarsson
 Jóhann Sigurðsson
 Helgi Skúlason as The medium
 Árni Tryggvason
 Helga Ragnheiður Óskarsdóttir as Girl with violin
 Lilja Þórisdóttir as Bjorg (as Lilja Thorisdottir)

See also
 List of submissions to the 56th Academy Awards for Best Foreign Language Film
 List of Icelandic submissions for the Academy Award for Best Foreign Language Film

References

External links
 
 

1983 films
1983 horror films
1980s mystery films
Icelandic horror films
1980s Icelandic-language films
Mystery horror films